In academic publishing, a scientific journal is a periodical publication intended to further the progress of science, usually by sharing findings from research with readers.  They are normally specialized based on discipline, with authors picking which one they send their manuscripts to.

Content

Scientific journals 
There are thousands of scientific journals in publication, with one estimate from 2012 indicating that there were 28,100 that were active, and many more have been published at various points in the past (see list of scientific journals). Most journals are highly specialized, although some of the oldest journals such as Science and Nature publish articles and scientific papers across a wide range of scientific fields. Scientific journals contain articles that have been peer reviewed, in an attempt to ensure that articles meet the journal's standards of quality and scientific validity. 

Although scientific journals are superficially similar to professional magazines (or trade journals), they are actually quite different.  Among others, scientific journals' papers' authors are experts who must cite everything (and how they have a works cited page).  They also deal with research, and are peer reviewed.  Meanwhile, trade journals are aimed at people in different fields, they focus on how people in them can do their jobs better, they cover information related to work, and they include tips and advice for improving performance.  Also, they are not scholarly.

Articles in scientific journals 
Articles in scientific journals are mostly written by active scientists such as students, researchers, and professors instead of professional journalists.  Their intended audience is others in the field (such as students and experts), plus their content is more advanced and sophisticated than what is found regular publications. They have different purposes, depending on the type.  Ones with original research are meant to share it with others in the field, review articles give summaries of research that has already been done, and perspective articles give researchers' views on research that their peers performed.  

Each article has several different sections, including the following: 

 The title; 
 Information about the author(s);
 The abstract, which is a one-paragraph summary of the article; 
 The introduction, including a background, why the research was done, research on this topic that has been done before, and (possibly) a hypothesis;
 The methodology or method, which includes the way the research was done, details concerning the study's sample, measures for assessment, and the procedure; 
 Findings or results, which summarize what the study found; 
 Conclusion, comments, or discussion, which both explain how the results answered the questions that were posed, as well as areas that could be researched in the future; and
 A list of works that the article's author cited.  

Scientific journal articles are not read casually like a person would read a magazine.  For, whereas magazine articles can be read in a more casual manner, reading one in a scientific periodical would require a lot more concentration.  More to the point, reading an article in a scientific journal would entail first reading the title, to see if it was related to the desired topic.  If it was, the next step would be to read the abstract (or summary or conclusion, if it's missing the abstract), to see if it seems worth reading.  And, if it seemed like reading it would be worthwhile, the reader would then read the whole article. 

Publishing research results is an essential part of helping science to advance. If scientists are describing experiments or calculations, they should explain how they did them so that an independent researcher could repeat the experiment or calculation to verify the results, or so that they could evaluate whatever the research article's findings were. Each such journal article also becomes part of the permanent scientific record.

Scope

Articles in scientific journals can be used in research and higher education. Scientific articles allow researchers to keep up to date with the developments of their field and direct their own research. An essential part of a scientific article is citation of earlier work. The impact of articles and journals is often assessed by counting citations (citation impact). Some classes are partially devoted to the explication of classic articles, and seminar classes can consist of the presentation by each student of a classic or current paper. Schoolbooks and textbooks have been written usually only on established topics, while the latest research and more obscure topics are only accessible through scientific articles. In a scientific research group or academic department it is usual for the content of current scientific journals to be discussed in journal clubs. Public funding bodies often require the results to be published in scientific journals. Academic credentials for promotion into academic ranks are established in large part by the number and impact of scientific articles published. Many doctoral programs allow for thesis by publication, where the candidate is required to publish a certain number of scientific articles.

Wording

Articles tend to be highly technical, representing the latest theoretical research and experimental results in the field of science covered by the journal. They are often incomprehensible to anyone except for researchers in the field and advanced students. In some subjects this is inevitable given the nature of the content. Usually, rigorous rules of scientific writing are enforced by the editors; however, these rules may vary from journal to journal, especially between journals from different publishers. Articles are usually either original articles reporting completely new results or reviews of current literature. There are also scientific publications that bridge the gap between articles and books by publishing thematic volumes of chapters from different authors. Many journals have a regional focus, specializing in publishing papers from a particular geographic region, like African Invertebrates.

History 
In the 17th century, scientists wrote letters to each other, and included scientific ideas with them.  Then, in the mid-17th century, scientists began to hold meetings and share their scientific ideas.  Eventually, they led to starting organizations, such as the Royal Society (1660) and the French Academy of Sciences (1666). In 1665, the French Journal des sçavans and the English Philosophical Transactions of the Royal Society began systematically publishing research results. Over a thousand, mostly ephemeral, were founded in the 18th century, and the number has increased rapidly since then.

Peer review did not begin until the 1970s, and was seen as a way of enabling researchers who were not as well-known to have their papers published in journals that were more prestigious.  Though it was originally done by mailing copies of papers to reviewers, it is now done online.

Publishing process 
The authors of scientific articles are active researchers instead of journalists; typically, a graduate student or a researcher writes a paper with a professor. As such, the authors are unpaid and receive no compensation from the journal. However, their funding bodies may require them to publish in scientific journals. The paper is submitted to the journal office, where the editor considers the paper for appropriateness, potential scientific impact and novelty. If the journal's editor considers the paper appropriate, the paper is submitted to scholarly peer review. Depending on the field, journal and paper, the paper is sent to 1–3 reviewers for evaluation before they can be granted permission to publish. Reviewers are expected to check the paper for soundness of its scientific argument, including whether the author(s) are sufficiently acquainted with recent relevant research that bears on their study, whether the data was collected or considered appropriately and reproducibly, and whether the data discussed supports the conclusion offered and the implications suggested. Novelty is also key: existing work must be appropriately considered and referenced, and new results improving on the state of the art presented. Reviewers are usually unpaid and not a part of the journal staff—instead, they should be "peers", i.e. researchers in the same field as the paper in question.

Standards and impact 
The standards that a journal uses to determine publication can vary widely. Some journals, such as Nature, Science, PNAS, and Physical Review Letters, have a reputation of publishing articles that mark a fundamental breakthrough in their respective fields. In many fields, a formal or informal hierarchy of scientific journals exists; the most prestigious journal in a field tends to be the most selective in terms of the articles it will select for publication, and usually will also have the highest impact factor. In some countries, journal rankings can be utilized for funding decisions and even evaluation of individual researchers, although they are poorly suited for that purpose.

Reproducibility and replicability 

For scientific journals, reproducibility and replicability of the scientific results are core concepts that allow other scientists to check and reproduce the results under the same conditions described in the paper or at least similar conditions and produce similar results with similar measurements of the same measurand or carried out under changed conditions of measurement.

Types of articles

There are several types of journal article; the exact terminology and definitions vary by field and specific journal, but often include:
Letters (also called communications, and not to be confused with letters to the editor) are short descriptions of important current research findings that are usually fast-tracked for immediate publication because they are considered urgent.
Research notes are short descriptions of current research findings that are considered less urgent or important than Letters.
Articles are usually between five and twenty pages and are complete descriptions of current original research findings, but there are considerable variations between scientific fields and journals—80-page articles are not rare in mathematics or theoretical computer science.
Supplemental articles contain a large volume of tabular data that is the result of current research and may be dozens or hundreds of pages with mostly numerical data. Some journals now only publish this data electronically on the Internet. Supplemental information also contains other voluminous material not appropriate for the main body of the article, like descriptions of routine procedures, derivations of equations, source code, non-essential data, spectra or other such miscellaneous information.
Review articles do not cover original research but rather accumulate the results of many different articles on a particular topic into a coherent narrative about the state of the art in that field. Review articles provide information about the topic and also provide journal references to the original research. Reviews may be entirely narrative, or may provide quantitative summary estimates resulting from the application of meta-analytical methods.
Data papers are articles dedicated to describe datasets. This type of article is becoming popular and journals exclusively dedicated to them have been established, e.g. Scientific Data and Earth System Science Data.
Video papers are a recent addition to practice of scientific publications. They most often combine an online video demonstration of a new technique or protocol combined with a rigorous textual description.

The formats of journal articles vary, but many follow the general IMRAD scheme recommended by the International Committee of Medical Journal Editors. Such articles begin with an abstract, which is a one-to-four-paragraph summary of the paper. The introduction describes the background for the research including a discussion of similar research. The materials and methods or experimental section provides specific details of how the research was conducted. The results and discussion section describes the outcome and implications of the research, and the conclusion section places the research in context and describes avenues for further exploration.

In addition to the above, some scientific journals such as Science will include a news section where scientific developments (often involving political issues) are described. These articles are often written by science journalists and not by scientists. In addition, some journals will include an editorial section and a section for letters to the editor. While these are articles published within a journal, in general they are not regarded as scientific journal articles because they have not been peer-reviewed.

Electronic publishing

Electronic publishing is a new area of information dissemination. One definition of electronic publishing is in the context of the scientific journal. It is the presentation of scholarly scientific results in only an electronic (non-paper) form. This is from its first write-up, or creation, to its publication or dissemination. The electronic scientific journal is specifically designed to be presented on the internet. It is defined as not being previously printed material adapted, or retooled, and then delivered electronically.

Electronic publishing will likely continue to exist alongside paper publishing for the foreseeable future, since whilst output to a screen is important for browsing and searching, it is not well suited for extensive reading. Formats suitable both for reading on paper, and for manipulation by the reader's computer will need to be integrated. Many journals are electronically available in formats readable on screen via web browsers, as well as in portable document format PDF, suitable for printing and storing on a local desktop or laptop computer. New tools such as JATS and Utopia Documents provide a 'bridge' to the 'web-versions' in that they connect the content in PDF versions directly to the World Wide Web via hyperlinks that are created 'on-the-fly'. The PDF version of an article is usually seen as the version of record, but the matter is subject to some debate.

Electronic counterparts of established print journals already promote and deliver rapid dissemination of peer-reviewed and edited, "published" articles. Other journals, whether spin-offs of established print journals, or created as electronic only, have come into existence promoting the rapid dissemination capability, and availability, on the Internet. In tandem with this is the speeding up of peer review, copyediting, page makeup, and other steps in the process to support rapid dissemination.

Other improvements, benefits and unique values of electronically publishing the scientific journal are easy availability of supplementary materials (data, graphics and video), lower cost, and availability to more people, especially scientists from non-developed countries. Hence, research results from more developed nations are becoming more accessible to scientists from non-developed countries.

Moreover, electronic publishing of scientific journals has been accomplished without compromising the standards of the refereed, peer review process.

One form is the online equivalent of the conventional paper journal. By 2006, almost all scientific journals have, while retaining their peer-review process, established electronic versions; a number have moved entirely to electronic publication. In a similar manner, most academic libraries buy the electronic version and purchase a paper copy only for the most important or most-used titles.

There is usually a delay of several months after an article is written before it is published in a journal, making paper journals not an ideal format for announcing the latest research. Many journals now publish the final papers in their electronic version as soon as they are ready, without waiting for the assembly of a complete issue, as is necessary with paper. In many fields in which even greater speed is wanted, such as physics, the role of the journal at disseminating the latest research has largely been replaced by preprint databases such as arXiv.org. Almost all such articles are eventually published in traditional journals, which still provide an important role in quality control, archiving papers, and establishing scientific credit.

Cost

Many scientists and librarians have long protested the cost of journals, especially as they see these payments going to large for-profit publishing houses. To allow their researchers online access to journals, many universities purchase site licenses, permitting access from anywhere in the university, and, with appropriate authorization, by university-affiliated users at home or elsewhere. These may be quite expensive, sometimes much more than the cost for a print subscription, although this may reflect the number of people who will be using the license—while a print subscription is the cost for one person to receive the journal; a site-license can allow thousands of people to gain access.

Publications by scholarly societies, also known as not-for-profit-publishers, usually cost less than commercial publishers, but the prices of their scientific journals are still usually several thousand dollars a year. In general, this money is used to fund the activities of the scientific societies that run such journals, or is invested in providing further scholarly resources for scientists; thus, the money remains in and benefits the scientific sphere.

Despite the transition to electronic publishing, the serials crisis persists.

Concerns about cost and open access have led to the creation of free-access journals such as the Public Library of Science (PLoS) family and partly open or reduced-cost journals such as the Journal of High Energy Physics. However, professional editors still have to be paid, and PLoS still relies heavily on donations from foundations to cover the majority of its operating costs; smaller journals do not often have access to such resources.

Based on statistical arguments, it has been shown that electronic publishing online, and to some extent open access, both provide wider dissemination and increase the average number of citations an article receives.

Copyright
Traditionally, the author of an article was required to transfer the copyright to the journal publisher. Publishers claimed this was necessary in order to protect authors' rights, and to coordinate permissions for reprints or other use. However, many authors, especially those active in the open access movement, found this unsatisfactory, and have used their influence to effect a gradual move towards a license to publish instead. Under such a system, the publisher has permission to edit, print, and distribute the article commercially, but the authors retain the other rights themselves.

Even if they retain the copyright to an article, most journals allow certain rights to their authors. These rights usually include the ability to reuse parts of the paper in the author's future work, and allow the author to distribute a limited number of copies. In the print format, such copies are called reprints; in the electronic format, they are called postprints. Some publishers, for example the American Physical Society, also grant the author the right to post and update the article on the author's or employer's website and on free e-print servers, to grant permission to others to use or reuse figures, and even to reprint the article as long as no fee is charged. The rise of open access journals, in which the author retains the copyright but must pay a publication charge, such as the Public Library of Science family of journals, is another recent response to copyright concerns.

See also

References

Sources 

 A.J. Meadows, ed. The Scientific Journal. London : Aslib, c1979. 
 R.E. Abel et al. "Scholarly Publishing: Books Journals, Publishers, and Libraries in the Twentieth Century". N.Y.: Wiley, 2002. 
 D.W. King et al. "Scientific Journals in the United States: their Production, Use, and Economics". Stroudsberg, PA: Hutchinson-Ross, 1981 

 A. Gielas & A. Fyfe, eds. "Editorship and the Editing of Scientific Journals, 1750–1950", Special Issue: Centaurus. International Journal for the History of Science and its Cultural Aspects, 2020.

External links 

 The cost of publishing in a scientific journal, some examples and recommended reading from OpenWetWare life scientists' wiki

 
Technical communication
17th-century introductions